Each year, the Utah Mr. Basketball award is given to the person chosen as the best high school boys basketball player in the U.S. state of Utah, in the United States.  Class 5A was introduced in 1994. Class 6A was introduced in 2018.

The award has been given since 1987 by the Deseret News. Winners are chosen by the Utah Associated Press Sportscasters and Sportswriters Association (UAPSSA).

Award winners

Schools with multiple winners

References 

Mr. and Miss Basketball awards
Awards established in 1987
1987 establishments in Utah
Lists of people from Utah
Mr. Basketball